This is a list of shopping malls in France.

The two largest and most visited shopping malls of France are Les Quatre Temps in La Défense near Paris, and La Part-Dieu in Lyon which is going to be extended of 32,000 m² in 2020 and become the largest shopping mall of France.

References

Shopping malls
France
 List